Eucalyptus × lamprocalyx is a tree or shrub that is endemic to the Kimberley region of Western Australia. It has tessellated bark on its trunk and branches, sessile, broadly lance-shaped leaves arranged in opposite pairs, flower buds in groups of between seven and eleven and oval or urn-shaped fruit. It is considered to be a natural hybrid between Corymbia cadophora and C. polycarpa.

Description
It has tessellated greyish bark on the trunk and branches.

Taxonomy and naming
Eucalyptus × lamprocalyx was first formally described in 1834 by William Blakely who gave it the name Eucalyptus lamprocalyx and published the description in his book, A Key to the Eucalypts. The Australian Plant Census considers this tree to be a natural hybrid between Corymbia cadophora and C. polycarpa, but it does not yet have a name in the genus Corymbia.

Distribution and habitat
This eucalypt grows in woodland in the western Kimberley region of Western Australia.

References

Eucalypts of Western Australia
lamprocalyx
Myrtales of Australia
Taxa named by William Blakely
Plants described in 1834
Plant nothospecies